Newport Masonic Hall is historic building located at Newport, New Castle County, Delaware. Listed on the National Register of Historic Places as Armstrong Lodge No. 26, A. F. & A. M., it was built in 1913, and consists of a two-story, five bay, rectangular brick main block with a long, one-story rectangular rear wing to form a 'T'-plan. A large, arch-roofed brick addition was built in 1958. The building is in a restrained Colonial Revival style. The main block has a gable roof.  It was designed with two commercial spaces on the ground floor, and a lodge room and auditorium on the second.

The building was added to the National Register of Historic Places in 1993.

References

Masonic buildings completed in 1913
Buildings and structures in New Castle County, Delaware
Clubhouses on the National Register of Historic Places in Delaware
Colonial Revival architecture in Delaware
Masonic buildings
1913 establishments in Delaware
National Register of Historic Places in New Castle County, Delaware